Elisha is a prophet in the Hebrew Bible, the Quran, and Baha'i writings.

Other persons with the same given name include:

Inventors
Elisha Gray (1835–1901), American electrical engineer considered by some to be the true inventor of the telephone
Elisha Otis (1811–1861), American industrialist, founder of the Otis Elevator Company, and inventor of an elevator safety device

Politicians and lawyers
Elisha Hunt Allen (1804–1883), American congressman, lawyer and diplomat, and Chief Justice of the Kingdom of Hawaii Supreme Court and diplomat for the Kingdom of Hawaii
Elisha Baxter (1827-1899), tenth Governor of Arkansas
Elisha Cooke, Sr. (1637–1715), physician, politician, and businessman, elected Speaker of the Massachusetts House of Representatives
Elisha Cooke, Jr. (1678-1837), physician and politician from the Province of Massachusetts Bay; son of the above
Elisha Dyer (1811-1890), American politician and 25th Governor of Rhode Island
Elisha Dyer, Jr. (1839–1906), American politician and 45th Governor of Rhode Island; son of the above
Elisha P. Ferry (1825–1895), twice Governor of the Washington Territory and the first Governor of the State of Washington
Elisha Harris (1791-1861), 20th Governor of Rhode Island
Elisha Lewis (died 1867), American politician
Elisha Litchfield (1785-1859), American merchant and member of the US House of Representatives from New York
Elisha Mathewson (1767–1853), US Senator from Rhode Island
Elisha Payne (1731-1807), American businessman and politician
Elisha McCallion (born 1982), Irish female Sinn Féin politician
Elisha Marshall Pease (1812–1883), fifth and thirteenth Governor of Texas
Elisha Reynolds Potter (1764–1835), Federalist Party US Congressman and Speaker in the Rhode Island State Assembly
Elisha R. Potter (1811–1882), justice of the Rhode Island Supreme Court and member of the US House of Representatives; son of the above
Elisha Williams (1694–1755), Congregational minister, legislator, jurist and rector of Yale College

Other
Elisha ben Abuyah (before 70–?), Jewish rabbi and religious authority
Elisha (Nestorian patriarch), patriarch of the Church of the East from 524 to 537
Elisha Cook, Jr. (1903–1995), American actor
Elisha Cuthbert (born 1982), Canadian actress
Elisha Kent Kane (1820-1857), American explorer and medical officer
Eli Manning (born 1981), American former National Football League quarterback
Elisha Peck (1789–1851), American businessman
Elisha Scott (1893–1959), Irish association football goalkeeper
Elisha Wiesel (born 1972), American businessman, chief information officer of Goldman Sachs

See also
Elishah, a person in the biblical book of Genesis
Elisa (given name)

English unisex given names
English feminine given names
English masculine given names